The order of precedence in the Philippines is the protocol used in ranking government officials and other personages in the Philippines. Purely ceremonial in nature, it has no legal standing, and does not reflect the presidential line of succession nor the equal status of the three branches of government established in the 1987 Constitution.

Order of government officials of the Philippines
 HE President (Bongbong Marcos)
 HE Vice president (Sara Duterte)
 Former presidents of the Philippines:
Joseph Estrada (30 June 1998 to 20 January 2001)
Gloria Macapagal Arroyo (20 January 2001 to 30 June 2010)
Rodrigo Duterte (30 June 2016 to 30 June 2022)
 President of the Senate (Juan Miguel Zubiri)
 Speaker of the House of Representatives (Martin Romualdez)
 Chief Justice of the Philippines (Alexander Gesmundo)
 Secretary of Foreign Affairs (Enrique Manalo)
 Foreign Ambassadors Extraordinary and Plenipotentiary (in order of presentation of their credentials, with the Apostolic Nuncio as the diplomatic corps' traditional primus inter pares) 
Dean of the Diplomatic Corps (Charles John Brown)
 Executive Secretary (Lucas Bersamin)
 Secretary of Finance (Benjamin Diokno)
 Secretary of Justice (Jesus Crispin Remulla)
 Secretary of Agriculture (Bongbong Marcos) (OIC)
 Secretary of Public Works and Highways (Manuel Bonoan)
 Secretary of Education (Sara Duterte)
 Secretary of Labor and Employment (Bienvenido Laguesma)
 Secretary of National Defense (Carlito Galvez Jr.)
 Secretary of Health (Maria Rosario Vergeire) (OIC)
 Secretary of Trade and Industry (Alfredo E. Pascual)
 Secretary of Migrant Workers (Susan Ople)
 Secretary of Human Settlements and Urban Development (Jose Acuzar)
 Secretary of Social Welfare and Development (Rex Gatchalian)
 Secretary of Agrarian Reform (Conrado Estrella III)
 Secretary of Environment and Natural Resources (Maria Antonia Yulo-Loyzaga)
 Secretary of the Interior and Local Government (Benjamin Abalos Jr.)
 Secretary of Tourism (Christina Frasco)
 Secretary of Transportation (Jaime Bautista)
 Secretary of Science and Technology (Renato Solidum Jr.)
 Secretary of Budget and Management (Amenah Pangandaman)
 Secretary of Energy (Raphael P.M. Lotilla)
 Secretary of Information and Communications Technology (Ivan John Uy)
 Foreign Envoys Extraordinary and Ministers Plenipotentiary
 Director-General of the National Economic and Development Authority (Arsenio Balisacan)
 Press Secretary (Cheloy Garafil) (OIC)
 Director-General of the National Security Council (Eduardo Año)
 Head of the Presidential Management Staff (Zenaida Angping)
 Solicitor-General (Menardo Guevarra)
 Presidential Legal Counsel (Juan Ponce Enrile)
 Chairman of the Metropolitan Manila Development Authority (Carlo Dimayuga III) (acting)
 Chairman of the National Commission on Muslim Filipinos (Guiling A. Mamondiong)
 Other Presidential Advisers with Cabinet rank
 Members of the Senate (ordered by length of service)
 Members of the House of Representatives (ordered by length of service)
 Associate Justices of the Supreme Court of the Philippines
 Heads of Constitutional Commissions
Civil Service Commission (Karlo Nograles)
 Commission on Elections (George Erwin M. Garcia)
 Commission on Audit (Gamaliel Cordoba) (Ad Interim)
 Members of the Council of State who are not Cabinet Members
 Acting heads of departments and former vice-presidents of the Philippines
 Living former vice presidents of the Philippines (by seniority of assuming office):
 Teofisto Guingona Jr. (7 February 2001 – 30 June 2004)
 Noli de Castro (30 June 2004 – 30 June 2010)
 Jejomar Binay (30 June 2010 - 30 June 2016)
 Leni Robredo (30 June 2016 - 30 June 2022)
 Undersecretaries for Foreign Affairs
 Undersecretary for Administration
 Undersecretary for International Economic Relations
 Undersecretary for Migrant and Workers Affairs
 Undersecretary for Policy
 Undersecretary for Special and Ocean Concerns
 Ambassadors of the Philippines assigned to foreign posts
 Undersecretaries of the Department, including the Assistant Executive Secretaries
 Assistant Secretaries of Departments, Directors-General and Chiefs of Mission I and II of the Department of Foreign Affairs
 Governor of the Bangko Sentral (Felipe Medalla)
 Foreign Charges d’Affaires de missi, Foreign Chargé d'Affaires ad interim
 Mayor of the city of Manila (Honey Lacuna)
 Presiding Justice of the Court of Appeals, the President of the University of the Philippines, the Chief of Staff of the Armed Forces of the Philippines, Commissioners, or other officers with the rank of Undersecretary
 Presiding Justice of the Court of Appeals (Remedios A. Salazar-Fernando)
 President of the University of the Philippines (Danilo Concepcion)
 Armed Forces of the Philippines Chief of Staff (Lt. Gen. Bartolome Vicente Bacarro, AFP)
 Heads of permanent United Nations Agencies in the Philippines who hold the rank of Director
 Provincial governors
 Vice-Chief of Staff (Lt. Gen. Erickson R. Gloria, AFP)
 Foreign ministers-counsellor, counsellors of embassies, consuls general, foreign military attaches with the rank of major general or rear admiral, and other officers of equivalent rank in the Armed Forces of the Philippines
 Judges of the Regional Trial Courts
 First secretaries of foreign embassies, foreign military attaches with the rank of brigadier general or commodore, and other officers of equivalent rank in the Armed Forces
 Mayors of chartered cities
 Directors or commissioners of bureaus and chiefs of offices
 Presidents, chairpersons, and managers of government-owned and controlled corporations
 Second secretaries and consuls of foreign embassies, foreign military attaches with the rank of colonel or lieutenant colonel, and other officers of equivalent rank in the Armed Forces
 Third secretaries and vice consuls of foreign embassies, foreign military attaches with the rank of major or captain and other officers of equivalent rank in the Armed Forces

Notes

References

Government of the Philippines
Orders of precedence